Lobelia alsinoides is a species of plant in the family Campanulaceae.

References

alsinoides
Flora of India (region)